George Douglas, 16th Earl of Morton, KT, FRS, FRSE, FSA (3 April 1761 – 17 July 1827) was a British nobleman.

Life
He was the son of Sholto Douglas, 15th Earl of Morton, and Katherine Hamilton. He succeeded to the title Earl of Morton in 1774 aged only thirteen, following the death of his father. He was sent to Eton College to be educated. Following his education he conducted a Grand Tour of Europe, as was the fashion of the day, and visited most of the European Courts.

He was elected a Fellow of the Royal Society in February 1785. His proposers were Daniel Rutherford, John Robison, and Alexander Keith. He served as vice-president of the Royal Society of London occasionally from 1795 to 1819, if Joseph Banks was unavailable.

The Earl was a frequent member of the Royal Company of Archers. Also, he had an interest in horse breeding and was noted for his attempts to breed a quagga.

He served as a representative peer from 1784 to 1790 and as Queen's Chamberlain 1792 to 1818. He was also Lord Lieutenant of Fife from 1808 to 1824. He was also High Commissioner to the Church of Scotland.

On 11 August 1791 he was created Baron Douglas of Loch Leven, in the County of Kinross. Thereafter he took a seat in the House of Lords between Lord Howard de Walden and Lord Walsingham. He was knighted at St. James's Palace in 1797 as a Knight of the Thistle.

He died at the family estate of Dalmahoy House on 17 July 1827.

Family

On 13 August 1814, he married Susan Elizabeth Buller (daughter of Sir Francis Buller). They had no children.

He was succeeded in the earldom by his first cousin, George Sholto Douglas.  The barony of Douglas of Loch Leven became extinct on his death.

Freemasonry
Lord Morton was a Scottish Freemason. He was Initiated in Lodge Canongate Kilwinning, No. 2, on 30 November 1789. The source here cited states, incorrectly, that he was the 17th earl. Exactly one year later he was elected as Grand Master Mason of the Grand Lodge of Scotland.

During his term in office there were several notable events one concerning politics. 'It was declared by Grand Lodge, on 1 August [1791] that difference of political sentiments was to be no bar to Masonic fellowship, and that any Daughter Lodge guilty of excluding any Brother on that account merely would incur such censure as the Grand Lodge might at the time deem proper.'

See also
Lord Morton’s mare, once thought to demonstrate telegony.

References

External links
 Lodge Canongate Kilwinning, No. 2, (Edinburgh)

1761 births
1827 deaths
George Douglas, 16th Earl of Morton
Knights of the Thistle
Lord-Lieutenants of Fife
Lord-Lieutenants of Midlothian
Scottish representative peers
Lords High Commissioner to the General Assembly of the Church of Scotland
Fellows of the Royal Society
Members of the Royal Company of Archers
Peers of Great Britain created by George III